William Perry Hay (born in Eureka, Illinois on December 8, 1871; died in 1947) was an American zoologist known for work on crayfish and reptiles. He was the son of Oliver Perry Hay.

References 

1872 births
1947 deaths
People from Eureka, Illinois
19th-century American zoologists
20th-century American zoologists